Cheyniana microphylla (common name bush pomegranate) is a plant in the family Myrtaceae which is endemic to Western Australia.

It was first described in 1928 by Charles Gardner as Balaustion microphyllum, but was redescribed in 2009 by Barbara Rye as Cheyniana microphylla, when she narrowed the circumscription of Balaustion and described the new genus, Cheyniana.

Conservation status
It is considered to be "not threatened".

References

External links
Cheyniana microphylla occurrence data from the Australasian Virtual Herbarium

Endemic flora of Western Australia
Taxa named by Barbara Lynette Rye